Seema Trikha (born 31 August 1966) is a politician from Haryana State, India and is an elected Member of Haryana Legislative assembly (2014–present) representing the Badkhal Vidhan Sabha Constituency in Faridabad, Haryana. She is a member of Bharatiya Janata Party.

See also
Haryana Legislative Assembly
Manohar Lal Khattar
Politics of Haryana

References 

1966 births
Living people
Bharatiya Janata Party politicians from Haryana
People from Faridabad
Haryana MLAs 2019–2024
Haryana MLAs 2014–2019
21st-century Indian women politicians
Women members of the Haryana Legislative Assembly